Tal'ar Gharbi is a village in northern Aleppo Governorate, northwestern Syria.

Administratively the village belongs to Nahiya Akhtarin in A'zaz District. Nearby localities include Tal'ar Sharqi  to the east, and Qantarah  to the north.

Demographics
In the 2004 census, Tal'ar Gharbi had a population of 988. In late 19th century, traveler Martin Hartmann noted Tal'ar as a Turkish and Arab (Bedouin) mixed village of 20 houses, then located in the Ottoman nahiyah of Azaz-i Turkman.

References

Populated places in Azaz District
Turkmen communities in Syria